St. Paul Evangelical Lutheran Church is a Lutheran church in Appleton, Wisconsin, affiliated with the Wisconsin Evangelical Lutheran Synod.

The building was constructed in 1907. It was added to the National Register of Historic Places in 2008 for its architectural significance.

References

Churches on the National Register of Historic Places in Wisconsin
Lutheran churches in Wisconsin
Churches completed in 1907
Churches in Appleton, Wisconsin
Gothic Revival church buildings in Wisconsin
National Register of Historic Places in Outagamie County, Wisconsin
Wisconsin Evangelical Lutheran Synod churches
Religious organizations established in 1867